All That Matters is an album by Michael Bolton, released in 1997, and was his first studio album since 1993's The One Thing. Bolton was aided in production by Babyface and Tony Rich, and among the songwriters are Bolton, Diane Warren, Babyface, Lamont Dozier, Gary Burr, and Tony Rich. Bolton’s U.S. fans were puzzled by the album’s title, "All That Matters", until the phrase was found on the bonus track, "When There Are No Words", on the UK version of the album. The two singles from the album, "The Best of Love", and "Safe Place from the Storm" were disappointing in sales and radio play, and fans were disappointed that the songs were performed only a handful of times during Bolton’s 1998 tour in support of the album.

Bolton recorded the pop version of "Go the Distance" for the soundtrack to the animated film Hercules. The song was nominated for both the Academy Award for Best Original Song and the Golden Globe Award for Best Original Song, but ultimately lost both to Celine Dion's hit "My Heart Will Go On" from Titanic. "Go the Distance" peaked at #24 on the Billboard Hot 100 chart and went to #1 on the Hot Adult Contemporary Tracks chart, Bolton's ninth song to top this chart. The song was also included on the All That Matters album.

Despite the lead single's relative success (#24 on the Hot 100), the album failed to achieve substantial success, partly because subsequent singles from the album failed to make any significant impact on the charts and due to the altering musical tastes (which were in favor of teen-pop at the time). Thus, the album debuted at a disappointing #39 and after some weeks of descending the chart it completely disappeared from the Billboard Top 200.

Track listing

Personnel 
 Michael Bolton – lead vocals, backing vocals (1, 7)
 Derek Nakamoto – keyboards (1, 2, 3, 6, 9, 11)
 Walter Afanasieff – keyboards (4, 13), synthesizers (4), bass programming (4), drum programming (4), rhythm programming (4), synth bass (13)
 Dan Shea – additional keyboards (4, 13), additional drum programming (4), additional rhythm programming (4), computer programming (4, 13), sound designer (4)
 Tony Rich – keyboards (5, 12, 14), drums (5, 12, 14), backing vocals (5, 12, 14), bass (12)
 Keith Thomas – acoustic piano (7), synthesizers (7), bass and drum programming (7)
 Barry J. Eastman – keyboards (8, 10), drum programming (8, 10)
 Eric Rehl – synthesizer programming (8, 10)
 David Gleeson – Synclavier programming (13)
 Dann Huff – guitar (2, 4, 6, 7, 11, 13), electric guitar (12, 14)
 Dean Parks – guitar (2)
 Michael Landau – guitar (4, 13)
 Peter Moore – acoustic guitar (5, 12, 14)
 Don Kirkpatrick – guitar (6)
 Jerry McPherson – guitar (7)
 Ira Siegel – guitar (8), acoustic guitar (10), electric guitar (10)
 Paul Jackson Jr. – guitar (9)
 Reggie Hamilton – bass guitar (2, 3, 6, 9, 11)
 LaMarquis Jefferson – bass guitar (5)
 Brian Borwell – drums (1)
 Robert Chiarelli – drum programming (2, 3, 6, 9, 11)
 Denny Weston Jr. – drums (3), percussion (3, 9, 11)
 Chad Cromwell – drums (7)
 Mark Hammond – additional drum programming (7)
 Sammy Merendino – additional drum programming (8, 10)
 John Robinson – drums (13)
 Terry McMillan – percussion (7)
 Bashiri Johnson – percussion (8, 10)
 Jeremy Lubbock – orchestra arrangement and conductor (13)
 Jesse Levy – orchestra contractor (13)
 Valerie Davis – backing vocals (1)
 Marc Nelson – backing vocals (1, 2, 6, 8, 9)
 Guy Roche – backing vocals (1)
 Bob Bailey – backing vocals (3)
 Kim Fleming – backing vocals (3)
 Vicki Hampton – backing vocals (3)
 Jamie Houston – backing vocals (3, 9)
 Alex Brown – backing vocals (4)
 Lynn Davis – backing vocals (4)
 Jim Gilstrap – backing vocals (4)
 Phillip Ingram – backing vocals (4)
 Gary Burr – backing vocals(7)
 Lisa Cochran – backing vocals (7)
 Tim Davis – backing vocals (7)
 Sharon Bryant-Gallowey – backing vocals (8, 10)
 Cindy Mizelle – backing vocals (8, 10)
 Audrey Wheeler – backing vocals (8, 10)
 Gordon Chambers (10)
 Philip D. Hunter – backing vocals (11)
 Jean McClain – backing vocals (11)
 Pam Trotter – backing vocals (11)
 Sandy Griffith – backing vocals (13)
 Claytoven Richardson – backing vocals (13)
 Jeanie Tracy – backing vocals (13)
 Tumeko Allen – backing vocals (14)

Production
 Producers and Arrangements – Michael Bolton (all tracks); Guy Roche (Track 1); Jamie Houston (Tracks 2, 3, 6, 9 & 11); Walter Afanasieff (Tracks 4 & 13); Tony Rich (Tracks 5, 12 & 14); Keith Thomas (Track 7); Barry J. Eastman (Tracks 8 & 10).
 Executive Producers – Michael Bolton and Louis Levin
 Engineers – Mario Luccy (Track 1); Michael Scott Reiter (Tracks 1, 2, 3, 6, 8-12); Moana Suchard (Track 1, 6 & 12); Steve Milo (Tracks 1, 3-12 & 14); Thom Russo (Track 1); Jeff Balding (Tracks 2, 4, 6 & 12); David Gleeson (Track 4); John Frye (Tracks 5, 12 & 14); Bill Whittington (Track 7); Barry J. Eastman (Tracks 8 & 10); Mark Partis (Track 8 & 10); Dana Jon Chappelle (Track 13).
 Assistant Engineers – Dave Reed (Tracks 1, 2, 3, 6, 9 & 11); Moana Suchard (Track 1); John Mooney (Track 1); Mike Baumgartner (Tracks 1, 6 & 12); Tom Bender (Tracks 1 & 8); Steve Milo (Tracks 2 & 13); Aaron Lepley (Tracks 2, 3 & 11); Errin Familia (Tracks 2, 3, 6, 9 & 11); John "Geetus" Aguto (Tracks 2, 3, 6, 8-11 & 14); Kyle Bess (Track 2); Mark Hagen (Tracks 2, 4, 6 & 12); Phil Blackman (Tracks 2, 3, 6, 9 & 11); Shawn McLean (Track 2); John Saylor (Tracks 3 & 11); Mike Rew (Track 3 & 6); Steve Brawley (Track 4); Tyson Leeper (Track 4); Greg Parker (Track 7); Brian Vieberts (Tracks 8 & 10); Jason Goldstein (Tracks 8, 10 & 11); Steve Durkee (Track 9); James Saez (Track 10); Tim Lauber (Track 11); Bill Kinsley (Track 13); Chris Theis (Track 13); Glen Marchese (Track 13); Greg Gasparino (Track 13).
 Additional Engineer on Track 13 – David Gleeson
 Strings on Track 13 recorded by John Kurlander
 Mixing – Mick Guzauski (Tracks 1, 8, 13 & 14); Jon Gass (Tracks 2 & 12); Michael Scott Reiter (Tracks 3, 6 & 11); Dave Reiztas (Tracks 4, 5 & 10); Bill Whittington (Track 7); Robert Chiarelli (Track 9).
 Mixed at Barking Dog Recording (Mount Kisco, NY); The Hit Factory and Quad Studios (New York, NY); Brandon's Way Recording and Record Plant (Los Angeles, CA); Larrabee North (Studio City, CA); The Bennett House (Franklin, TN); 
 Digital Editing on Track 7 – Shaun Shankel
 Mastered by Bob Ludwig at Gateway Mastering (Portland, ME).
 Art Direction – Christopher Austopchuk
 Design – Kerstin Bach
 Photography – Naomi Kaltman
 Make-up – Mel Rau
 Stylists – Gemina Aboitiz and Chris McMillan
 Management – Louis Levin

Certifications

References 

Michael Bolton albums
1997 albums
Columbia Records albums